Typhoon Haitang, known in the Philippines as Typhoon Feria, was the first super typhoon of the 2005 season in the northwestern Pacific. It had winds up to 260 km/h (160 mph) at peak intensity, and caused over 18 serious injuries and 13 confirmed deaths in Taiwan and People's Republic of China. Damage totaled about $1.17 billion (2005 USD), most of which occurred in mainland China.

Meteorological history

Impact

Taiwan

Mainland China
An estimated 15 million people were affected by the typhoon. A total of 2,151 homes were destroyed,  of roads were washed out and several thousand power lines were downed by the storm Damage to infrastructure amounted to ¥8 billion (US$1.17 billion).

See also

 List of tropical cyclones
 List of wettest tropical cyclones
 Timeline of the 2005 Pacific typhoon season
 Typhoon Soulik (2013)
 Tropical Storm Trami (2013)
 Typhoon Nepartak (2016)
 Typhoon Herb
 Typhoon Soudelor (2015)

References

External links

JMA General Information of Typhoon Haitang (0505) from Digital Typhoon
JMA Best Track Data of Typhoon Haitang (0505) 
JMA Best Track Data (Graphics) of Typhoon Haitang (0505)
JMA Best Track Data (Text)
JTWC Best Track Data of Super Typhoon 05W (Haitang)
05W.HAITANG from the U.S. Naval Research Laboratory
 BBC news article (Taiwan)
 BBC news article (China)
 Reuters article
 CBC article
 Guardian Unlimited
 Xinhua (China)

2005 Pacific typhoon season
Typhoons in Japan
Typhoons in Taiwan
Typhoons in China
F
F
Typhoon Haitang
Typhoon Haitang
Typhoon Haitang
Typhoons
Haitang